Lumiar is a freguesia (civil parish) and district of Lisbon, the capital of Portugal. Located in northern Lisbon, Lumiar is east of Carnide, north of Alvalade, west of Olivais, and south of Santa Clara and partially of Lisbon's border with Odivelas. The population in 2011 was 45,605,

History

Located now within the municipality of Lisbon, it was established in the 13th century.

Geography
There are 5 major neighbourhoods in Lumiar: 
Quinta das Conchas, 
Calçada de Carriche
Alto do Lumiar
Paço do Lumiar
Telheiras (partially shared with Carnide).

Landmarks
Local landmarks and interesting places include one of the biggest public greenspace/urban parks in the city Quinta das Conchas e dos Lilases, the Paço do Lumiar, and several old palaces are also scattered throughout the neighbourhood.
 Alvalade Stadium (home of Sporting Lisbon)
 National Museum of Costume
 Colégio de Santa Doroteia
 Monteiro-Mor Park
 National Theatre and Dance Museum

Sports
The Freguesia is home to Academia do Lumiar, a basketball team of the Proliga (Portugal).

References

External links

Lumiar heraldry

Parishes of Lisbon